The tárogató (töröksíp, Turkish pipe; plural tárogatók or, anglicized, tárogatós;  or torogoata) refers to two different woodwind instruments commonly used in both Hungarian and Romanian folk music.  The modern tárogató was intended to be a recreation of the original tárogató, but the two instruments are thought to have little in common.

History

Early use
Mention of the tárogató in Hungarian writings dates back at least as long ago as the 15th century.  It is not clear whether it was first brought into Europe by the Hungarians when they first emigrated from the east in the 9th century. It is certain, however, that instruments of this type, descended from the Middle Eastern zurna, were introduced into Eastern Europe by the Turks in the Middle Ages, as evidenced by the term töröksip—"Turkish pipe"—which was used as a synonym for tárogató.  It is possible that instruments from both traditions were combined into one entity. The tárogató has a Turkish origin, and it appeared in Hungary during the Turkish wars. Up to about the 18th century, the tárogató was a type of shawm, with a double reed, conical bore, and no keys.

Being a very loud and raucous instrument, the tárogató was used as a signaling instrument in battle (like the bugle or the bagpipe). However, depending on the type of reed used, it can also give off a very subtle, and yet, deep, mellow sound when played at a relaxed, steady pace.

Because the tárogató was representative of the Rákóczi's War for Independence (1703–1711), its use was suppressed in the 18th century by the Habsburg monarchy. The instrument was eventually abandoned, being considered too overpowering for a concert hall.

Modern usage

In the 1890s, a modern version was invented by Vencel József Schunda, a Budapest instrument maker. It uses a single reed, like a clarinet or saxophone, and has a conical bore, similar to the saxophone. The instrument is made of wood, usually black grenadilla wood like a clarinet or oboe. The most common size, the soprano tárogató in B♭, is about 29 inches (74 cm) in length and has a mournful sound similar to a cross between an English horn and a soprano saxophone. Other sizes exist: one maker, János Stowasser, advertised a family of seven sizes of which the largest was a contrabass tárogató in E♭. The new tárogató bears very little resemblance with the historical tárogató and the two instruments should not be confused. It has been suggested that the name schundaphone would have been more accurate, but tárogató was used because of the nationalistic image that the original instrument had.

This instrument was a symbol of Hungarian aristocracy, and the favorite woodwind instrument of Governor Miklós Horthy.

Manufacturing in Hungary ceased after World War II, though tárogatós continued to be made in Romania and other countries. In the 1990s several Hungarian makers started producing the instrument again.

A modern tárogató may occasionally be heard in Act 3 of Tristan und Isolde by Richard Wagner where it has become traditional in some opera houses (e.g. the Royal Opera House, London) to use it instead of the off-stage cor anglais for the last passage (bars 999-1149) of the Shepherd's air, but Wagner did not specify this, merely suggesting in the score "a specially built simple natural instrument".
  
In the 1920s, Luţă Ioviţă, who played the instrument in the army during World War I, brought it to Banat (Romania), where it became very popular under the name taragot.

In 1928, the British music journal Melody Maker reported that the Oxford-based clarinettist Frank Dyer was using "a taragossa, a novelty Hungarian instrument which is a cross between a saxophone and a Cor Anglais" with his Symphonic Dance Orchestra. No such instrument as a "taragossa" exists: the rest of the journal's description fits that of the tárogató.

Dumitru Fărcaş, who was born in Maramureş, made the instrument known all over the world and was considered to be the most famous tárogató player.

German saxophonist Peter Brötzmann has used the tárogató in free jazz and free improvisation.

American reed players Charles Lloyd, Scott Robinson & Michael Marcus have occasionally used the tárogató.  Joe Lovano has also displayed interest in the instrument featuring it extensively in his episode of SOLOS: The Jazz Sessions, on Steve Kuhn's Mostly Coltrane, and on his own albums Trio Tapestry and Roma (with Enrico Rava) (both ECM Records).

In 2015, Irina Ross, a Romanian singer, released her single "Taragot" which features the instrument in a dance-pop song.

See also
 Music of Romania
 Music of Hungary

References

External links
Tárogató Műhely
Video of Dumitru Fărcaş playing the Tárogató
Tárogató/Taragot regional map
Tárogató.lap.hu 
 Henk Jansen's comments about the spread of the taragot (tarogato) in Europe
Irina Ross - Taragot (Official Video)

Single-reed instruments
Hungarian musical instruments
Romanian musical instruments